National road 37 (abbreviated as DK37) is a main road (class G road)() route belonging to Polish national roads network, located in West Pomeranian Voivodeship. In the future a new junction will be constructed, linking road 37 with expressway S6.

Until December 31, 2005 the route was categorized as powiat road 0507Z (even earlier 17-451). On January 1, 2006, based on the Regulation of Minister of Infrastructure,  of May 6, 2005, the route was included in the category of national roads.

The matter of upgrading the road category to national road was for some time on the circle of interests of politicians, mostly from Samoobrona party. The route had a particular importance for Andrzej Lepper, who lived in Zielnowo near Darłowo. Because of that, the road has been nicknamed "Lepperówka".

Permissible axle load 

Until March 13, 2021 

Localities along road 37 
 Darłowo
 Rusko
 Domasławice
 Słowino
 Sęczkowo
 Karwice (road 6)

References

External links 
 
 
 

National roads in Poland